Ronald Ralph Moeller (October 13, 1938 – November 2, 2009) was a pitcher in Major League Baseball who played between  and  for the Baltimore Orioles (1956, 1958), Los Angeles Angels (1961 and 1963) and Washington Senators (1963). He was born in Cincinnati.

At start of his MLB career, Moeller was nicknamed The Kid by the Orioles players both for his boyish looks and making his big-league debut at age seventeen. He pitched in part of two seasons for Baltimore before his selection by the Los Angeles Angels in the expansion draft following the  season. In 1963, his last major league season, Moeller went 2–0 in three starts for the Washington Senators.

In a four-season career, Moeller posted a 6–9 record with a 5.78 ERA in 52 appearances, including 22 starts, 104 strikeouts, and 100 walks in 152⅔ innings of work. He also pitched in the minor leagues from 1956 through 1963, compiling a 37–38 record with a 3,30 ERA in 118 games, 94 as a starter.

Moeller died in his native Cincinnati at the age of 71.

External links
Baseball Reference
BR – Minor leagues
Retrosheet

1938 births
2009 deaths
Amarillo Gold Sox players
Baltimore Orioles players
Baseball players from Cincinnati
Elder High School alumni
Hawaii Islanders players
Los Angeles Angels players
Major League Baseball pitchers
Miami Marlins (IL) players
San Antonio Missions players
Vancouver Mounties players
Washington Senators (1961–1971) players